Radøy is an island in Vestland county, Norway. It is located east of Fedjefjorden in Alver Municipality.

The island lies in the Nordhordland region of the county.  The Hjeltefjorden and Radfjorden flow along the western coast and the Lurefjorden and Radsundet flow along the eastern coast.  The island of Fosnøyna lies to the north of Radøy, the island of Toska lies to the west, the island of Holsnøy lies to the south, and the Lindås peninsula lies to the east.

The island had a population of 5,280 inhabitants in 2001, with the largest urban areas being the village of Manger on the west-central coast and the village of Bøvågen on the northern coast. Radøy is connected to the mainland via the Alversund Bridge on the southern tip of the island.

Historically, the island was part of the old municipalities of Manger which was divided into three municipalities in 1924: Hordabø, Manger, and Sæbø.  In 1964, almost all of the island was united as Radøy municipality (with the rest being part of Lindås municipality. In 2020, the whole island became part of Alver Municipality.

See also
List of islands of Norway

References

Islands of Vestland
Alver (municipality)